Baney (also known as Santiago de Baney) is a town and municipality in Equatorial Guinea. It is located in Bioko Norte Province and has a population of 29,366 in 2015.

External links

Populated places in Bioko Norte
Bioko